Luis Pérez-Sala Valls-Taberner (born 15 May 1959) is a Spanish former racing driver who competed in Formula One, Formula 3, Formula 3000 and Touring Cars. He was also the team principal of HRT Formula 1 Team during the 2012 F1 season.

Pérez-Sala started his racing career in karting before graduating to racing production-based cars in the early 1980s, initially competing in Renault 5s before competing internationally in the Alfa Romeo Alfasud Sprint Cup in 1983. He competed in the 1984 FIA European Formula 3 Championship in a Ralt-Alfa Romeo, steadily improving across the season and taking a second place at Knutstorp and a fifth at Jarama to place tenth in the season standings. In 1985 he switched to the Italian Formula 3 Championship, finishing seventh overall and scoring a win. The following year he moved to Formula 3000 with great success, winning races at Birmingham and Enna in 1986 and finishing fourth in that year's championship. He remained in F3000 for the following year, joining the factory Lola team, taking wins at Donington Park and the Le Mans Bugatti Circuit and finishing as runner-up to Stefano Modena in the championship. He became famous for his arguments with Alfonso de Vinuesa, caused by political views: the pair were involved in a spectacular crash in the F3000 race at Spa-Francorchamps in 1987.

The Minardi Formula One team signed Pérez-Sala for the  season, alongside compatriot Adrián Campos - the first time two Spanish drivers had raced together as team-mates in F1. He made his debut for them on 3 April 1988, at the season's opening race in Brazil, where he qualified 20th but failed to finish the race when his rear wing collapsed. Over the next five rounds, he continually outpaced Campos, who was replaced by Pierluigi Martini (Pérez-Sala's F3000 team-mate in 1986) from round six of the Championship in Detroit.

Pérez-Sala's only point came from a sixth place in the 1989 British Grand Prix. This was the first F1 points score by a Spanish driver in thirty years, and the first race in Minardi's history in which both of the team's cars finished in the points. Along with the two points Martini scored for finishing fifth in the same race, the pair scored enough points to keep Minardi out of pre-qualifying for the rest of the season. At the end of the 1989 season, after failing to qualify for the season ending Australian Grand Prix (while Martini qualified a brilliant 3rd behind only the McLaren-Honda cars of Ayrton Senna and Alain Prost), he left Formula One having started 26 of the 32 Grands Prix that he entered. After his retirement from Formula One, Pérez-Sala became a regular in the Spanish Touring Car Championship, winning the series in 1991 and 1993, before moving into sportscar and endurance racing. He and team-mate Manel Cerqueda won the GTB class title in the Spanish GT Championship in 2003 and 2004, and finished second overall in the championship in 2008 - his last season in competition before retiring.

Since 1990, Pérez-Sala has worked as a commentator and analyst for a number of media outlets, including RTVE, El País and TV3. In addition he is an instructor for racing drivers, and is involved in the Joves Pilots del Circuit de Catalunya programme, an initiative backed by the Generalitat de Catalunya, the Circuit de Barcelona-Catalunya and the motorsport authorities in Catalonia whose graduates include Jaime Alguersuari, Miguel Molina, Dani Clos, Albert Costa and Miki Monrás.

In July 2011, he was recruited as a consultant for the Hispania F1 team, which was founded by former Minardi teammate Campos. On 15 December 2011, it was announced that he would become team principal of HRT, replacing Colin Kolles.

His nephew, Daniel Juncadella, is also a racing driver, best known for winning the 2011 Macau Grand Prix Formula Three race, and has also competed in the Formula 3 Euro Series.

Racing record

Complete International Formula 3000 results
(key) (Races in bold indicate pole position; races in italics indicate fastest lap.)

Complete Formula One results
(key)

Complete Spanish Touring Car Championship results 
(key) (Races in bold indicate pole position; races in italics indicate fastest lap.)

References

External links
Profile at www.grandprix.com
 

1959 births
Living people
Catalan racing drivers
Spanish racing drivers
Catalan Formula One drivers
Spanish Formula One drivers
Italian Formula Three Championship drivers
Minardi Formula One drivers
International Formula 3000 drivers
World Touring Car Championship drivers
Porsche Supercup drivers
World Sportscar Championship drivers
24 Hours of Spa drivers
FIA European Formula 3 Championship drivers
Motorsport announcers
Formula One team principals